Kirk Joseph deViere (born January 27, 1970) is a former Democratic member of the North Carolina State Senate, having representing the 19th district from 2019 to 2023. He was first elected in the 2018 elections, defeating incumbent state senator Wesley Meredith and won re-election in the 2020 elections. deViere previously served on the Fayetteville, North Carolina city council from 2015 to 2017.

Political career
In 2015, deViere was elected to the Fayetteville, North Carolina city council. deViere had previously been a candidate in both the 2013 and 2017 Fayetteville, North Carolina mayoral elections, placing third each time in the primary and failing make the general election.

In 2018, deViere announced his intention to run against incumbent Republican Wesley Meredith for the North Carolina State Senate District 19. On May 8, 2018 deViere defeated Clarence Donaldson in the Democratic primary by a margin of 62.6% to 37.4%. In the 2018 general election, deViere went on to defeat incumbent Senator Wesley Meredith by a margin of 50.4 to 49.6 (433 votes).

In 2020, deViere defeated former senator Wesley Meredith during the general election by a margin of 51.4% to 48.5% in their rematch.

deViere was endorsed in the 2020 election by President Barack Obama  and Vice President Joe Biden

North Carolina Senate committee memberships
Standing or select committees (2021-2022 Session)
 Appropriations/Base Budget
Appropriations on Department of Transportation
 Commerce and Insurance
Finance
 Transportation
 Joint Legislative Transportation Oversight Committee
 Joint Legislative Program Evaluation Oversight Committee

Standing or select committees (2019-2020 Session)
 Appropriations on Department of Transportation
 Pensions and Retirement and Aging
 Transportation
 Joint Legislative Transportation Oversight Committee
 Joint Legislative Program Evaluation Oversight Committee

Electoral history

2022

2020

2018

References

1970 births
Living people
Huntingdon College alumni
Troy University alumni
Democratic Party North Carolina state senators
21st-century American politicians